Fazlija Šaćirović (born 4 May 1957) is a Yugoslav boxer. He competed at the 1976 Summer Olympics and the 1980 Summer Olympics. At the 1980 Summer Olympics, he lost to Veli Koota of Finland.

References

External links
 

1957 births
Living people
Flyweight boxers
Bantamweight boxers
Yugoslav male boxers
Olympic boxers of Yugoslavia
Boxers at the 1976 Summer Olympics
Boxers at the 1980 Summer Olympics
Place of birth missing (living people)
Mediterranean Games gold medalists for Yugoslavia
Mediterranean Games medalists in boxing
Competitors at the 1979 Mediterranean Games
AIBA World Boxing Championships medalists